This is a list of flag bearers who have represented Mauritius at the Olympics.

Flag bearers carry the national flag of their country at the opening ceremony of the Olympic Games.

See also
Mauritius at the Olympics

References

Mauritius at the Olympics
Mauritius
Olympic flagbearers
Olympics